Orono Wor Petchpun (Thai: โอโรโน่ ว.เพชรพูล, born August 22, 1978) is a Thai super featherweight kickboxer and bantamweight mixed martial artist fighting out of Wor Petchpun Gym in Nakhon Ratchasima, Thailand. He is former Lumpinee Stadium champion and three-time champion of Thailand. He is the current It's Showtime 65MAX World champion and is based in Singapore where he is a member of the Evolve Mixed Martial Arts fight team.

Biography and career
Orono started out Muay thai at the age of 15, a fairly late age to start fighting in Thailand. A year later he had his first fight in Bangkok. In 2001 he won the WMC World Muaythai (122 lb) title against Petchek Sor Suwannapakdee.

Formerly fighting under the name Orono Majestic gym (โอโรโน่ มาเจสติกยิม), Orono has mixed it up with many of the top names in muay thai. He holds two KO wins over The Contender Asia champion Yodsaenklai Fairtex, two decisions over K-1 MAX champion Buakaw Por. Pramuk and Saenchai Sor Kingstar. After fighting all the big names in Thailand at his weight class, Orono made his international debut in 2007 at the SLAMM Nederland vs Thailand III event against William Diender.

In March 2012, Orono announced his intention to compete in mixed martial arts.

Titles
 2009 Rang Yeh tournament title
It's Showtime
 2009 It's Showtime 65MAX World champion
World Professional Muaythai Federation
 2008 WPMF World Muay Thai champion 140 lb
Lumpinee Stadium 
 2007 Lumpinee champion 130 lb
Professional Boxing Association of Thailand (PAT)
 2002-2003 Thailand champion 130 lb
 2001-2002 Thailand champion 126 lb
World Muay Thai Council
 2001 WMC Muay Thai World champion 122 lb

Fight record

|-  bgcolor="#FFBBBB"
| 2010-12-04 || Loss ||align=left| Tuantong Pumphanmuang || Omnoi Stadium || Bangkok, Thailand || Decision || 5 || 3:00
|-  bgcolor="#CCFFCC"
| 2010-09-09 || Win ||align=left| Janrob Sakhomsin || Wanmitrchai Fights, Rajadamnern Stadium || Bangkok, Thailand || Decision || 5 || 3:00
|-  style="background:#fbb;"
| 2010-08-01 || Loss||align=left| Singdam Kiatmuu9 || Muay Lok 2010 Grand Stage || Tokyo, Japan || Decision (Majority) || 5 || 3:00
|-  bgcolor="#CCFFCC"
| 2010-05-29 || Win ||align=left| Atty Gol || It's Showtime 2010 Amsterdam || Amsterdam, Netherlands || Decision (5-0) || 5 || 3:00
|-
! style=background:white colspan=9 |
|-
|-  bgcolor="#CCFFCC"
| 2010-04-10 || Win ||align=left| Damien Alamos || Sherdana K-1 Gala || Sardinia, Italy ||KO (Left elbow )|| 2 || 
|-  bgcolor="#CCFFCC"
| 2010-03-13 || Win ||align=left| Egon Racs || Oktagon presents: It's Showtime 2010 || Milan, Italy || TKO (Doctor Stoppage) || 3 || 
|-  bgcolor="#FFBBBB"
| 2010-02-10 || Loss ||align=left| Petchboonchu FA Group || Daorungprabath Fight, Rajadamnern Stadium || Bangkok, Thailand || Decision || 5 || 3:00
|-  bgcolor="#CCFFCC"
| 2009-12-19 || Win ||align=left| Panpetch Chor Nah Phattalung || Rang Yeh Tournament finals || Bangkok, Thailand || Decision || 5 || 3:00
|-
|-
! style=background:white colspan=9 |
|-
|-  bgcolor="#CCFFCC"
| 2009-11-14 || Win ||align=left| Lerdsila Chumpairtour || Muaythai Lumpinee Krikkrai Fights || Bangkok, Thailand || Decision || 5 || 3:00
|-
|-  bgcolor="#CCFFCC"
| 2009-09-26 || Win ||align=left| Pettanong Petfergus || Muaythai Lumpinee Krikkrai Fight || Bangkok, Thailand || Decision || 5 || 3:00
|-  bgcolor="#CCFFCC"
| 2009-08-01 || Win ||align=left| Singdam Kiatmuu9 || Lumpini Stadium || Bangkok, Thailand || Decision (Unanimous) || 5 || 3:00
|-  bgcolor="#CCFFCC"
| 2009-06-20 || Win ||align=left| Tuanthong Phunphanmoung || Lumpini Stadium || Bangkok, Thailand || Decision (Unanimous) || 5 || 3:00
|-  bgcolor="#CCFFCC"
| 2009-05-16 || Win ||align=left| Hassan El Hamzaoui || It's Showtime 2009 Amsterdam || Amsterdam, Netherlands || Decision (Unanimous) || 5 || 3:00
|-  bgcolor="#CCFFCC"
! style=background:white colspan=9 |
|-
|-  bgcolor="#CCFFCC"
| 2009-03-28 || Win||align=left| Warren Stevelmans || Battle of Sweden|| Stockholm, Sweden || Decision (Unanimous) || 5 || 3:00
|-  bgcolor="#FFBBBB"
| 2009-02-24 || Loss ||align=left| Nong-O Sit Or || Por.Pramuk, Lumpinee Stadium || Bangkok, Thailand || Decision (3-2) || 5 || 3:00
|-  bgcolor="#CCFFCC"
| 2009-01-25 || Win ||align=left| Petchmankong Phetfocus || Channel 7 Stadium|| Thailand || Decision (Unanimous) || 5 || 3:00
|-  bgcolor="#FFBBBB"
| 2008-11-29 || Loss ||align=left| Faldir Chahbari || It's Showtime 2008 Eindhoven || Eindhoven, Netherlands || Decision (Majority) || 3 || 3:00
|-  bgcolor="#FFBBBB"
| 2008-09-30 || Loss ||align=left| Saenchainoi Toyotarayong || Suklumpini Kriekrai, Lumpinee Stadium || Bangkok, Thailand || Decision (Unanimous) || 5 || 3:00
|-  bgcolor="#CCFFCC"
| 2008-08-03 || Win ||align=left| Atsushi Suzuki || Kickboxing vs Muay Thai - Target 1st - || Tokyo, Japan || KO || 2 || 
|-  bgcolor="#CCFFCC"
| 2008-07-15 || Win ||align=left| Sarawut Lookbaanyai || Phetpiya, Lumpinee Stadium || Bangkok, Thailand || Decision (Unanimous) || 5 || 3:00
|-  bgcolor="#FFBBBB"
| 2008-05-02 || Loss ||align=left| Saenchai Sor Kingstar || Suklumpini Kriekrai, Lumpinee Stadium || Bangkok, Thailand || Decision (Unanimous) || 5 || 3:00
|-  bgcolor="#CCFFCC"
| 2008-02-26 || Win ||align=left| Petchmankong Sit Or || Por Pramuk, Lumpinee Stadium || Bangkok, Thailand || Decision (Unanimous) || 5 || 3:00
|-  bgcolor="#CCFFCC"
| 2008-01-28 || Win ||align=left| Alex Cobra || || Suphan Buri, Thailand || KO (Left elbow)|| 1 || 2:24
|-
! style=background:white colspan=9 |
|-
|-  bgcolor="#CCFFCC"
| 2007-12-07 || Win ||align=left| Saenchai Sor Kingstar || Suklumpini Kriekrai, Lumpinee Stadium || Bangkok, Thailand || Decision (Unanimous) || 5 || 3:00
|-
! style=background:white colspan=9 |
|-
|-  bgcolor="#c5d2ea"
| 2007-10-06 || Draw ||align=left| Petchmankong Phetfocus || Lumpinee Stadium || Bangkok, Thailand || Decision || 5 || 3:00
|-  bgcolor="#CCFFCC"
| 2007-09-18 || Win ||align=left| Petchtaksin Sor Thampetch || Lumpinee Stadium || Bangkok, Thailand || Decision || 5 || 3:00
|-  bgcolor="#CCFFCC"
| 2007-08-04 || Win ||align=left| Lerdsila Chumpairtour || Lumpinee Stadium || Bangkok, Thailand || Decision || 5 || 3:00
|-  bgcolor="#CCFFCC"
| 2007-05-25 || Win ||align=left| Petchmankong Sit Or || Phetyindee, Lumpinee Stadium || Bangkok, Thailand || Decision || 5 || 3:00
|-  bgcolor="#CCFFCC"
| 2007-05-06 || Win ||align=left| William Diender || SLAMM Nederland vs Thailand III || Haarlem, Netherlands || KO (Left roundkick) || 1 || 1:58
|-  bgcolor="#CCFFCC"
| 2007-02-06 || Win ||align=left| Petchmankong Sit Or || Fairtext, Lumpinee Stadium || Bangkok, Thailand || Decision || 5 || 3:00
|-  bgcolor="#FFBBBB"
| 2006-12-22 || Loss ||align=left| Singdam Kiatmuu9 || Phetyindee, Lumpinee Stadium || Bangkok, Thailand || Decision || 5 || 3:00
|-  bgcolor="#FFBBBB"
| 2006-11-17 || Loss ||align=left| Nopparat Keatkhamtorn|| Gai Yang Haadao Marathon tournament || Nakhon Ratchasima, Isan || Decision (Unanimous) || 3 || 3:00
|-  bgcolor="#CCFFCC"
| 2006-11-17 || Win ||align=left| Duangsompong Kor Sapaothong || GaiYangHaadao Marathon tournament || Nakhon Ratchasima, Isan || Decision (Unanimous) || 3 || 3:00
|-  bgcolor="#CCFFCC"
| 2006-09-01 || Win ||align=left| Singdam Kiatmuu9 || Por.Pramuk, Lumpinee Stadium || Bangkok, Thailand || Decision || 5 || 3:00
|-  bgcolor="#CCFFCC"
| 2006-08-08 || Win ||align=left| Kaew Fairtex || Fairtex, Lumpinee Stadium || Bangkok, Thailand || Decision || 5 || 3:00
|-  bgcolor="#FFBBBB"
| 2006-07-04 || Loss ||align=left| Doungsompong K.Sapaotong || Paianun, Lumpinee Stadium || Bangkok, Thailand || TKO || 2 || 
|-  bgcolor="#CCFFCC"
| 2006-05-30 || Win ||align=left| Doungsompong K.Sapaotong || Changsiamchai, Lumpinee Stadium || Bangkok, Thailand || Decision || 5 || 3:00
|-  bgcolor="#FFBBBB"
| 2006-05-05 || Loss ||align=left| Singdam Kiatmuu9 || Paianun, Lumpinee Stadium || Bangkok, Thailand || Decision || 5 || 3:00
|-  bgcolor="#CCFFCC"
| 2006-03-24 || Win ||align=left| Attachai Fairtex || Wanboonya, Lumpinee Stadium || Bangkok, Thailand || Decision (Unanimous) || 5 || 3:00
|-  bgcolor="#CCFFCC"
| 2006-02-10 || Win ||align=left| Teelek Fairtex || Fairtex Lumpini fight night, Lumpinee Stadium || Bangkok, Thailand || Decision (Unanimous) || 5 || 3:00
|-  bgcolor="#FFBBBB"
| 2005-11-04 || Loss ||align=left| Saenchai Sor Kingstar || Fairtex, Lumpinee Stadium || Bangkok, Thailand || Decision (Unanimous) || 5 || 3:00
|-  bgcolor="#CCFFCC"
| 2005-09-27 || Win ||align=left| Banput Sor Boonya || Wanboonya, Lumpinee Stadium || Bangkok, Thailand || Decision (Unanimous) || 5 || 3:00
|-  bgcolor="#fbb"
| 2005-07-19 || Loss||align=left| Kongpipop Petchyindee || Petchyindee, Lumpinee Stadium || Bangkok, Thailand || Decision || 5 || 3:00
|-  bgcolor="#FFBBBB"
| 2005-05-06 || Loss ||align=left| Singdam Kiatmuu9 || Petchyindee, Lumpinee Stadium || Bangkok, Thailand || Decision (Unanimous) || 5 || 3:00
|-
! style=background:white colspan=9 |
|-
|-  bgcolor="#FFBBBB"
| 2005-03-18 || Loss ||align=left| Nopparat Keatkhamtorn || Petchyindee & Sapaotong, Lumpinee Stadium || Bangkok, Thailand || Decision (Unanimous) || 5 || 3:00
|-  bgcolor="#CCFFCC"
| 2005-01-21 || Win ||align=left| Yodsaenklai Fairtex || Wanboonya, Lumpinee Stadium || Bangkok, Thailand || TKO (Knee strikes) || 3 ||
|-  bgcolor="#FFBBBB"
| 2004-12-07 || Loss ||align=left| Yodbuangarm Lukbanyai || Lumpinee Stadium Birthday Show || Bangkok, Thailand || Decision (Unanimous) || 5 || 3:00
|-  bgcolor="#c5d2ea"
| 2004-10-15 || Draw ||align=left| Kongpipop Petchyindee || Petchpiya, Lumpinee Stadium || Bangkok, Thailand || Decision draw || 5 || 3:00
|-  bgcolor="#CCFFCC"
| 2004-09-14 || Win ||align=left| Singdam Kiatmuu9 || Petchpiya, Lumpinee Stadium || Bangkok, Thailand || Decision (Unanimous) || 5 || 3:00
|-  bgcolor="#CCFFCC"
| 2004-08-10 || Win ||align=left| Singdam Kiatmuu9 || Petchyindee, Lumpinee Stadium || Bangkok, Thailand || Decision (Unanimous) || 5 || 3:00
|-  bgcolor="#CCFFCC"
| 2004-07-09 || Win ||align=left| Sakutpetch Sor Sakunpan || Petchpiya, Lumpinee Stadium || Bangkok, Thailand || Decision (Unanimous) || 5 || 3:00
|-  bgcolor="#CCFFCC"
| 2004-05-28 || Win ||align=left| Sibmean Lamtongkarnpat || Petchyindee, Lumpinee Stadium || Bangkok, Thailand || Decision (Unanimous) || 5 || 3:00
|-  bgcolor="#CCFFCC"
| 2004-05-04 || Win ||align=left| Yodsaenklai Fairtex || Petchyindee, Lumpinee Stadium || Bangkok, Thailand || TKO (Elbows and Punches) || 4 ||
|-  bgcolor="#FFBBBB"
| 2004-03-26 || Loss ||align=left| Kongpipop Petchyindee || Petchyindee & Wanwerapon, Lumpinee Stadium || Bangkok, Thailand || Decision (Unanimous) || 5 || 3:00
|-  bgcolor="#c5d2ea"
| 2004-02-24 || Draw ||align=left| Kongpipop Petchyindee || Petchyindee & Wanwerapon, Lumpinee Stadium || Bangkok, Thailand || Decision (Unanimous) || 5 || 3:00
|-  bgcolor="#CCFFCC"
| 2004-01-29 || Win ||align=left| Noppakao Sor Wanchard || Daorungchujarean, Rajadamnern Stadium || Bangkok, Thailand || Decision (Unanimous) || 5 || 3:00
|-  bgcolor="#FFBBBB"
| 2003-11-14 || Loss ||align=left| Esarasak Jor Rajadakorn || Lumpinee Superights, Lumpinee Stadium || Bangkok, Thailand || Decision (Unanimous) || 5 || 3:00
|-  bgcolor="#FFBBBB"
| 2003-09-19 || Loss ||align=left| Chalermpon Keatsununta || Petchpiya, Lumpinee Stadium || Bangkok, Thailand || Decision (Unanimous) || 5 || 3:00
|-  bgcolor="#FFBBBB"
| 2003-08-22 || Loss ||align=left| Singdam Kiatmuu9 || Petchpiya, Lumpinee Stadium || Bangkok, Thailand || Decision (Unanimous) || 5 || 3:00
|-  bgcolor="#CCFFCC"
| 2003-06-13 || Win ||align=left| Nongbee Kiatyongyut || Petchpiya, Rajadamnern Stadium || Bangkok, Thailand || Decision  || 5 || 3:00
|-  bgcolor="#cfc"
|  2003-02-07 || Win||align=left| Kongpipop Petchyindee || Petchyindee, Lumpinee Stadium|| Bangkok, Thailand || Decision  || 5 || 3:00
|-  bgcolor="#fbb"
| 2002-12-03 || Loss||align=left| Nontachai Kiatwanlop || Lumpinee Stadium || Bangkok, Thailand || Decision || 5 || 3:00
|-
! style=background:white colspan=9 |
|-  bgcolor="#cfc"
| 2002- || Win||align=left| Tongthai Por Burapha || || Bangkok, Thailand || Decision  || 5 || 3:00
|-
! style=background:white colspan=9 |
|-  bgcolor="#fbb"
| 2002- || Loss||align=left| Singdam Kiatmuu9 ||  || Bangkok, Thailand || Decision || 5 || 3:00
|-
! style=background:white colspan=9 |

|-  bgcolor="#cfc"
| 2002-08-06 || Win ||align=left| Nontachai Kiatwanlop || Petchyindee, Lumpinee Stadium || Bangkok, Thailand || Decision  || 5 || 3:00

|-  bgcolor="#c5d2ea"
| 2002-07-05 || Draw||align=left| Nontachai Kiatwanlop || Petchyindee, Lumpinee Stadium || Bangkok, Thailand || Decision  || 5 || 3:00
|-  bgcolor="#CCFFCC"
| 2002-05-10 || Win ||align=left| Buakaw Por.Pramuk || Lumpinee Stadium || Bangkok, Thailand || Decision || 5 || 3:00
|-  bgcolor="#CCFFCC"
| 2002-03-22 || Win ||align=left| Chanrit Sit.Or || Lumpinee Stadium || Bangkok, Thailand || Decision || 5 || 3:00
|-  bgcolor="#CCFFCC"
| 2001-08-07 || Win ||align=left| Buakaw Por.Pramuk || Lumpinee Stadium || Bangkok, Thailand || Decision || 5 || 3:00
|-  bgcolor="#CCFFCC"
| 2001-07-08 || Win ||align=left| Chinarat Watcharin || Channel 7 Stadium || Bangkok, Thailand || Decision || 5 || 3:00
|-  bgcolor="#CCFFCC"
| 2001-02-17 || Win ||align=left| Phetarun Sor.Suwanpakdee || Lumpinee Stadium || Bangkok, Thailand || Decision || 5 || 3:00
|-
! style=background:white colspan=9 |
|-  bgcolor="#CCFFCC"
| 2000-12- || Win ||align=left| Ekasit Sitkriengkrai || Lumpinee Stadium || Bangkok, Thailand || TKO || 5 || 
|-  bgcolor="#fbb"
| 2000-11- || Loss||align=left| Duwa Kong-Udom || Lumpinee Stadium || Bangkok, Thailand || Decision || 5 || 3:00
|-  bgcolor="#CCFFCC"
| 2000-10- || Win ||align=left| Chanrit Sit-O || Lumpinee Stadium || Bangkok, Thailand || Decision || 5 || 3:00
|-  style="background:#fbb;"
| 2000-09-13 || Loss ||align=left| Watcharachai Kaewsamrit || Lumpinee Stadium || Bangkok, Thailand || Decision || 5 || 3:00
|-  bgcolor="#CCFFCC"
| 2000-08- || Win ||align=left| Kotchasarn Singklongsi || Lumpinee Stadium || Bangkok, Thailand || Decision || 5 || 3:00
|-  bgcolor="#CCFFCC"
| 2000-07- || Win ||align=left| Charlie Chor.Chaitamil || Lumpinee Stadium || Bangkok, Thailand || Decision || 5 || 3:00
|-  bgcolor="#CCFFCC"
| 2000-06- || Win ||align=left| Theparat Kiatnoppadon || Lumpinee Stadium || Bangkok, Thailand || Decision || 5 || 3:00
|-  bgcolor="#fbb"
| 2000-05- || Loss||align=left| Duwa Kong-Udom || Lumpinee Stadium || Bangkok, Thailand || Decision || 5 || 3:00
|-  bgcolor="#CCFFCC"
| 2000-04- || Win ||align=left| Chinarat Watcharin || Lumpinee Stadium || Bangkok, Thailand || Decision || 5 || 3:00
|-  bgcolor="#CCFFCC"
| 2000-03-10 || Win ||align=left| Rattanakiat Tor.Rattanakiat || Lumpinee Stadium || Bangkok, Thailand || Decision || 5 || 3:00
|-  bgcolor="#CCFFCC"
| 2000-02- || Win ||align=left| Thanasak Wanchalerm || Rajadamnern Stadium || Bangkok, Thailand || Decision || 5 || 3:00
|-  bgcolor="#CCFFCC"
| 2000-01-18 || Win ||align=left| Chinarat Watcharin || Lumpinee Stadium || Bangkok, Thailand || Decision || 5 || 3:00
|-  bgcolor="#fbb"
| 1999-09-11 || Loss||align=left| Chinarat Watcharin ||  || Songkhla, Thailand || Decision || 5 || 3:00
|-  bgcolor="#CCFFCC"
| 1999-07-09|| Win ||align=left| Yodkatayu Vichitphan||Lumpinee Stadium || Bangkok, Thailand || Decision || 5 || 3:00
|-  bgcolor="#CCFFCC"
| 1998-12-|| Win ||align=left| Phetek Sor.Suwanpakdee||Lumpinee Stadium || Bangkok, Thailand || Decision || 5 || 3:00
|-
|-
| colspan=9 | Legend:

See also 
List of It's Showtime champions
List of male kickboxers

References

1978 births
Living people
Bantamweight kickboxers
Featherweight kickboxers
Lightweight kickboxers
Orono Wor Petchpun
Orono Wor Petchpun